The 2011–12 UNC Greensboro Spartans men's basketball team represented the University of North Carolina at Greensboro during the 2011–12 NCAA Division I men's basketball season. The Spartans began the year coached by Mike Dement who resigned after ten games.  Wes Miller was named interim coach on December 13, 2011, and became the youngest Division I men's basketball coach in the nation.  The team plays its home games at Greensboro Coliseum and are members of the North Division of the Southern Conference. They finished the season 13–19, 10–8 in SoCon play to be champions of the North Division. They lost in the semifinals of the Southern Conference Basketball tournament to Western Carolina.

Roster

Schedule

|-
!colspan=9| Exhibition

|-
!colspan=9| Regular Season

|-
!colspan=9| Southern Conference tournament

References

UNC Greensboro
UNC Greensboro Spartans men's basketball seasons
Southern Conference men's basketball champion seasons
2011 in sports in North Carolina
2012 in sports in North Carolina